Joseph de Lorraine (Anne Marie Joseph; 30 April 1679 – 29 April 1739) was a member of the House of Lorraine and Count of Harcourt. He was styled prince de Guise before becoming Count of Harcourt.

Biography

Born to Alphonse Henri, Count of Harcourt and his wife Marie Françoise de Brancas, he was second of three children.

He married Marie Louise Jeannin de Castille on 2 July 1705 and the couple had four children, three of which survived infancy and two had further issue. He died in 1739 aged 59. His female line descendants are the Dukes of Noailles through his eldest grand child Marie Charlotte de La Tour d'Auvergne, princesse de Beauvau, wife of Charles Juste de Beauvau.

Issue

Louise Henriette Françoise de Lorraine (1707 – 31 March 1737) married Emmanuel Théodose de La Tour d'Auvergne and had issue;
Marie Élisabeth Sofie de Lorraine (1710 – 2 August 1740) married Louis François Armand de Vignerot du Plessis and had issue;
Louis de Lorraine (17 December 1720 – 20 June 1747) never married; styled Prince of Harcourt but de facto Count of Harcourt
X de Lorraine (male) (January – May 1721) died unbaptised.

References and notes

Sources
Georges Poull, La maison ducale de Lorraine, 1991

1679 births
1739 deaths
House of Guise
House of Lorraine
Counts of Harcourt
17th-century French people
18th-century French people